The Commanding General of the Philippine Army (CGPA) is the overall commander and senior general of the Philippine Army, the ground warfare branch of the Armed Forces of the Philippines. It is normally held by a three-star rank of Lieutenant General. He has operational control and is responsible for overall operations of the army, and directly reports to the Chief of Staff of the armed forces.

Officeholders

Commanding Generals of the Philippine Revolutionary Army

Commanding Generals of the Philippine Army

See also
Armed Forces of the Philippines
Chief of Staff of the Armed Forces of the Philippines
Philippine Army

References

External links
Lineage of the Philippine Army Commanding Generals

Philippine Army
Armed Forces of the Philippines
Military history of the Philippines
Philippines
Filipino military leaders